The 1954 football season was São Paulo's 25th season since club's existence.

Overall

{|class="wikitable"
|-
|Games played || 64 (9 Torneio Rio-São Paulo, 26 Campeonato Paulista, 29 Friendly match)
|-
|Games won || 37 (4 Torneio Rio-São Paulo, 14 Campeonato Paulista, 19 Friendly match)
|-
|Games drawn || 13 (2 Torneio Rio-São Paulo, 5 Campeonato Paulista, 6 Friendly match)
|-
|Games lost || 14 (3 Torneio Rio-São Paulo, 7 Campeonato Paulista, 4 Friendly match)
|-
|Goals scored || 111
|-
|Goals conceded || 68
|-
|Goal difference || +43
|-
|Best result || 5–1 (H) v Ypiranga - Campeonato Paulista - 1954.10.01
|-
|Worst result || 1–5 (A) v Botafogo - Torneio Rio-São Paulo - 1954.06.26
|-
|Most appearances || 
|-
|Top scorer || 
|-

Friendlies

Official competitions

Torneio Rio-São Paulo

Record

Campeonato Paulista

Record

External links
official website 

Association football clubs 1954 season
1954
1954 in Brazilian football